Grasstree Hill is a rural locality in the local government area (LGA) of Clarence in the Hobart LGA region of Tasmania. The 2016 census recorded a population of 105 for the state suburb of Grasstree Hill.

History 
Grasstree Hill was gazetted as a locality in 1970. Grasstree Hill (the landform feature) is believed to have been named for the dwarf grass trees that grew on it. Shelstone was the name of the original town reserve but it was never made official.

Geography
Grasstree Hill Rivulet forms part of the south-eastern boundary.

Road infrastructure 
Route C324 (Grasstree Hill Road) passes through from south to north.

References

Towns in Tasmania
Localities of City of Clarence